(William) Geoffrey Rootes, 2nd Baron Rootes (14 June 1917 – 16 January 1992)  was the chairman of Rootes Motors (1964-1967), Chrysler UK (1967-1978) and Britain's National Economic Development Council (1968-1973).

Early life
Rootes was the first son of William Edward Rootes and Nora Press, and was educated at Port Regis, Harrow and Oxford.

He married his wife, Marian, on 15 August 1946. Their children were Sally Hayter Rootes and Nicholas Geoffrey Rootes, the 3rd Baron Rootes.

References

External links
 Portraits at National Portrait Gallery, London, U.K.

Barons in the Peerage of the United Kingdom
1917 births
1992 deaths
People educated at Harrow School
Alumni of Christ Church, Oxford